Coleophora kenyaensis is a species of moth in the family Coleophoridae. It is found in Kenya.

References 

 

kenyaensis
Moths described in 2015
Moths of Africa